Ilham Mahdi al Assi was a 13-year-old Yemeni girl who died as a result of bleeding following her first sexual intercourse with her husband,  23-year-old  Abed al-Hikmi, who was later detained by police. The practice of marrying young girls was condemned by an NGO as "child rape condoned under the guise of marriage."

Yemen has a tribal culture, and the marriage of young girls is common; most Yemeni girls are married before they reach puberty. A proposed law setting a minimum age of 17 for women and 18 for men to marry was opposed by conservative Yemenis, including women.

References

Child marriage in Yemen
Deaths in Yemen
Marital rape
Violence against women in Yemen